Matías is the Spanish version of Matthias. In Scandinavian languages (Norwegian, Swedish, Danish and Finnish) and in Portuguese it is unaccented as Matias.

Notable people with the name include:

Given name 
Matías Alemanno, Argentine rugby player
Matías Almeyda, Argentine footballer
Matías Cahais, Argentine footballer
Matías Emilio Delgado, Argentine footballer
Matías Duarte, Chilean computer engineer
Matías Draghi, Argentine footballer
Matías Escobar, Argentine footballer
Matías Fernández, Chilean footballer
Matías Funes, Honduran academic and politician
Matías Moroni, Argentine rugby player
Matías Noble, Argentine footballer
Matías Orlando, Argentine rugby player
Matías Paredes, Argentine hockey player
Matías Pavoni, Argentine footballer
Matías Prats Cañete, Spanish journalist and commentator
Matías Prats Luque, Spanish journalist and anchorman, son of Matías Prats Cañete
Matías Rodríguez, Argentine footballer
Matías Romero, Mexican politician
Matías Ruiz, Spanish baroque music composer
Matías Sarraute, Argentine footballer
Matías Vecino, Uruguyan footballer
Matías Vuoso, Mexican footballer
Matías Zaldívar, Argentine footballer

Surname 
Alexis Matías, Puerto Rican volleyball player
Angel Matías, Puerto Rican volleyball player

Spanish masculine given names